The Zürich Bible (Zürcher Bibel, also Zwinglibibel) is a Bible translation historically based on the translation by Huldrych Zwingli. Recent editions have the stated aim of maximal philological exactitude.

It is thought to be the first Bible to contain a map.

Froschau Bible
Zwingli's translation grew out of the Prophezey, an exegetical workshop taking place on every weekday, with the participation of all clerics of Zürich, working at a German rendition of Bible texts for the benefit of the congregation.

The translation of Martin Luther was used as far as it was already completed. This helped Zwingli to complete the entire translation four years before Luther. At the printing shop of Christoph Froschauer, the New Testament appeared from 1525 to 1529, and later parts of the Old Testament, with a complete translation in a single volume first printed in 1530, with an introduction by Zwingli and summaries of each chapter. This Froschauer Bible, containing more than 200 illustrations, became notable as a masterpiece of printing at the time. The translation is mainly due to Zwingli and his friend Leo Jud, pastor at the St. Peter parish.

The translation of the Old Testament was revised in 1540, that of the New Testament in 1574. Verse numbering was introduced in 1589.

In 1975, Amos Hoover of Denver, Pennsylvania, reprinted the 1536 edition, and the 1531 edition appeared under the imprint of the Theologischer Verlag Zürich in 1983.

Revisions
Up to 1665, the language of the translation was based on the written variant of High Alemannic (Swiss German) used for official documents. In 1665, this was abandoned for the emerging Standard German of the chancery of the prince-electorate Saxony-Wittenberg.

Fraumünster pastor Johann Caspar Ulrich (1705–1768) in the 1755/1756 revision added commentaries, interpretations and concordances. From this edition, the Bible became known as the Zwinglibibel.
From 1817, the edition was in the hands of the 
Zürich Bible and Missionary Society (Zürcher Bibel- und Missionsgesellschaft). Another revision dates to 1868, reprinted in 1892.

1931 revision
In 1907, a commission was formed with the purpose of another revision, with the aim of considering as much as possible recent result of biblical scholarship. The revision was completed in 1931, constituting essentially a new translation.

2007 revision
In 1984, on the 500th anniversary of Zwingli's birth, another revision was initiated by the General Synod of the Protestant Reformed Church of the Canton Zürich. However, it soon was decided to undertake a new translation of the entire Bible. At a total cost of four million Swiss francs, the project was completed in early 2007, and the Bible was published in printed and electronic form in June 2007.

See also
Luther Bible
German Bible translations
Reformation in Zürich

References

Online versions
   1531 version
 1534 version

External links

1536 Bachman Froschauer Bible

History of Zürich
1531 books
Bible translations into German
Huldrych Zwingli